The 2021 Qualico Mixed Doubles Classic (QMDC21) was held from September 30 to October 3, 2021 at the Banff and Canmore curling clubs in Banff and Canmore, Alberta. The bonspiel was a mixed doubles curling tournament, and was held in a round-robin format with a $30,000 purse. The event was the third edition of the annual Qualico Mixed Doubles Classic.  Many of the top Canadian curlers were featured at this event, as it served as one of three direct-entry qualifiers to the 2022 Canadian Mixed Doubles Curling Olympic Trials. The highest qualifying Canadian team that placed in top four qualified for the trials.

Teams
The teams are listed as follows:

Round-robin standings
Final round-robin standings

Round-robin results
All draw times are listed in Mountain Time (UTC−06:00).
Note: Sheets B 1 through 4 are at the Banff Curling Club. Sheets C 1 through 4 are at the Canmore Curling Club.

Draw 1
Thursday, September 30, 2:00 pm

Draw 2
Thursday, September 30, 4:30 pm

Draw 3
Thursday, September 30, 7:00 pm

Draw 4
Friday, October 1, 9:00 am

Draw 5
Friday, October 1, 11:30 am

Draw 6
Friday, October 1, 2:00 pm

Draw 7
Friday, October 1, 4:30 pm

Draw 8
Friday, October 1, 7:00 pm

Draw 9
Saturday, October 2, 9:00 am

Draw 10
Saturday, October 2, 11:30 am

Draw 11
Saturday, October 2, 2:00 pm

Draw 12
Saturday, October 2, 4:30 pm

Playoffs

Source:

Qualification Games
Saturday, October 2, 7:30 pm

Quarterfinals
Sunday, October 3, 9:00 am

Semifinals
Sunday, October 3, 11:30 am

Final
Sunday, October 3, 2:00 pm

Notes

References

External links
Official Website
CurlingZone

2021 in Canadian curling
Curling in Alberta
September 2021 sports events in Canada
October 2021 sports events in Canada
2021 in Alberta
Banff, Alberta
Canmore, Alberta
Mixed doubles curling